The MGWR Class K was a Midland Great Western Railway (MGWR)  designed by Martin Atock for passenger work and introduced from 1893.  They replaced earlier MGWR Class D locomotives that carried the same namesand numbers.  The class was also known as the Great Southern Railways (GSR) 650 G2 class.

Locomotives

Design and historical development

The design was a progression of the MGWR Class D standard passenger locomotive and resulted in a design more powerful than the MGWR Class D-bogie 4-4-0.  They were rebuilt with superheated boilers from 1918 increasing their power still further and becoming one of the few if not only superheated 2-4-0 classes in the world.

Services

They were initially allocated to top expresses such at the limited mail with some of the heaviest requiring double heading.  After the turn of the century they were displaced by  types to secondary duties throughout the MGWR network but became mainly based around the Sligo line in the GSR/CIÉ era.  On the Achill line they would be brought in for heavier trains particular after 6 coupled locomotives were banned after 1925 on that branch.  They remained active and useful into the 1950s with the last withdrawal in 1963.  The locomotive class was also noted for working on the Ballaghaderreen branch line in its final years.

Accidents and Incidents
Several of the class were damaged in civil war incidents in 1922/23.  In particular No. 20 Speedy was destroyed at Killala on 3 February 1923.

References

2-4-0 locomotives
5 ft 3 in gauge locomotives
K
Railway locomotives introduced in 1893
Scrapped locomotives
Steam locomotives of Ireland